The 1954 Pittsburgh Pirates season was the 73rd season of the Pittsburgh Pirates franchise; the 68th in the National League. The Pirates finished eighth and last in the league standings with a record of 53–101.

Offseason 
 December 1, 1953: Sonny Senerchia was drafted from the Pirates by the St. Louis Cardinals in the 1953 minor league draft.

Regular season 
During the season, Curt Roberts became the first black player in the history of the Pirates.

Season standings

Record vs. opponents

Game log

|- bgcolor="ccffcc"
| 1 || April 13 || Phillies || 4–2 || Law (1–0) || Roberts || Hetki (1) || 32,294 || 1–0
|- bgcolor="ffbbbb"
| 2 || April 14 || Phillies || 0–6 || Simmons || LaPalme (0–1) || — || 5,853 || 1–1
|- bgcolor="ffbbbb"
| 3 || April 15 || @ Dodgers || 4–7 || Meyer || Surkont (0–1) || Hughes || 13,496 || 1–2
|- bgcolor="ffbbbb"
| 4 || April 18 || @ Phillies || 0–6 || Roberts || Friend (0–1) || — ||  || 1–3
|- bgcolor="ffbbbb"
| 5 || April 18 || @ Phillies || 1–7 || Simmons || Law (1–1) || — || 9,975 || 1–4
|- bgcolor="ccffcc"
| 6 || April 19 || @ Giants || 7–5 || Hetki (1–0) || Hearn || — || 6,380 || 2–4
|- bgcolor="ffbbbb"
| 7 || April 20 || @ Giants || 2–6 || Antonelli || LaPalme (0–2) || — || 6,865 || 2–5
|- bgcolor="ccffcc"
| 8 || April 21 || Giants || 5–4 || Surkont (1–1) || Liddle || Hetki (2) || 13,552 || 3–5
|- bgcolor="ccffcc"
| 9 || April 22 || Giants || 7–4 || O'Donnell (1–0) || Gomez || — || 3,296 || 4–5
|- bgcolor="ffbbbb"
| 10 || April 23 || Dodgers || 5–6 (13) || Milliken || Purkey (0–1) || — || 10,574 || 4–6
|- bgcolor="ffbbbb"
| 11 || April 24 || Dodgers || 0–3 || Erskine || Hogue (0–1) || — || 8,671 || 4–7
|- bgcolor="ccffcc"
| 12 || April 25 || Dodgers || 9–3 || Law (2–1) || Newcombe || — || 8,671 || 5–7
|- bgcolor="ffbbbb"
| 13 || April 25 || Dodgers || 2–4 || Podres || LaPalme (0–3) || — || 23,714 || 5–8
|- bgcolor="ffbbbb"
| 14 || April 27 || @ Redlegs || 7–8 || Valentine || Surkont (1–2) || Smith || 3,634 || 5–9
|- bgcolor="ffbbbb"
| 15 || April 28 || @ Redlegs || 4–8 || Collum || Friend (0–2) || — || 1,206 || 5–10
|- bgcolor="ccffcc"
| 16 || April 29 || @ Cardinals || 4–3 || Purkey (1–1) || Haddix || Hetki (3) || 7,603 || 6–10
|-

|- bgcolor="ffbbbb"
| 17 || May 1 || @ Cardinals || 4–5 (10) || Lint || O'Donnell (1–1) || — || 6,745 || 6–11
|- bgcolor="ffbbbb"
| 18 || May 2 || @ Cubs || 3–5 || Minner || Law (2–2) || — || 17,472 || 6–12
|- bgcolor="ccffcc"
| 19 || May 2 || @ Cubs || 18–10 (8) || Friend (1–2) || Church || Hetki (4) || 7,636 || 7–12
|- bgcolor="ffbbbb"
| 20 || May 4 || @ Braves || 1–6 || Spahn || Surkont (1–3) || — || 12,383 || 7–13
|- bgcolor="ffbbbb"
| 21 || May 5 || @ Braves || 1–4 || Conley || Purkey (1–2) || — || 13,194 || 7–14
|- bgcolor="ffbbbb"
| 22 || May 6 || @ Braves || 0–3 || Burdette || O'Donnell (1–2) || — || 11,856 || 7–15
|- bgcolor="ffbbbb"
| 23 || May 8 || Giants || 1–2 || Antonelli || Law (2–3) || — || 7,147 || 7–16
|- bgcolor="ffbbbb"
| 24 || May 9 || Giants || 1–5 || Maglie || Surkont (1–4) || — || 4,577 || 7–17
|- bgcolor="ffbbbb"
| 25 || May 12 || Cardinals || 5–13 || Haddix || O'Donnell (1–3) || Brazle || 1,559 || 7–18
|- bgcolor="ffbbbb"
| 26 || May 13 || Braves || 2–4 || Nichols || Purkey (1–3) || — || 6,090 || 7–19
|- bgcolor="ccffcc"
| 27 || May 14 || Braves || 3–2 (10) || Surkont (2–4) || Spahn || — || 8,225 || 8–19
|- bgcolor="ccffcc"
| 28 || May 15 || Braves || 6–1 || Law (3–3) || Buhl || — || 3,366 || 9–19
|- bgcolor="ffbbbb"
| 29 || May 16 || Cubs || 3–12 || Minner || Friend (1–3) || — || 8,225 || 9–20
|- bgcolor="ccffcc"
| 30 || May 16 || Cubs || 5–1 || Thies (1–0) || Willis || — || 32,807 || 10–20
|- bgcolor="ffbbbb"
| 31 || May 17 || Cubs || 6–10 || Pollet || Purkey (1–4) || Davis || 1,420 || 10–21
|- bgcolor="ffbbbb"
| 32 || May 18 || Redlegs || 5–6 || Collum || LaPalme (0–4) || Smith || 5,696 || 10–22
|- bgcolor="ccffcc"
| 33 || May 19 || Redlegs || 3–2 || Surkont (3–4) || Valentine || — || 4,476 || 11–22
|- bgcolor="ffbbbb"
| 34 || May 20 || Cardinals || 4–17 || Poholsky || Purkey (1–5) || — || 4,902 || 11–23
|- bgcolor="ffbbbb"
| 35 || May 21 || @ Dodgers || 2–3 || Labine || Law (3–4) || Hughes || 7,202 || 11–24
|- bgcolor="ffbbbb"
| 36 || May 22 || @ Dodgers || 1–3 || Palica || Thies (1–1) || Hughes || 7,061 || 11–25
|- bgcolor="ffbbbb"
| 37 || May 23 || @ Dodgers || 4–5 || Roe || Friend (1–4) || — || 7,061 || 11–26
|- bgcolor="ffbbbb"
| 38 || May 23 || @ Dodgers || 2–6 || Loes || O'Donnell (1–4) || Milliken || 18,409 || 11–27
|- bgcolor="ccffcc"
| 39 || May 24 || @ Dodgers || 5–2 || Surkont (4–4) || Erskine || — || 9,386 || 12–27
|- bgcolor="ffbbbb"
| 40 || May 25 || @ Giants || 4–21 || Antonelli || Purkey (1–6) || — || 7,206 || 12–28
|- bgcolor="ffbbbb"
| 41 || May 26 || @ Giants || 1–2 || Gomez || Law (3–5) || — || 2,849 || 12–29
|- bgcolor="ffbbbb"
| 42 || May 28 || Phillies || 0–4 (6) || Dickson || Surkont (4–5) || — || 5,521 || 12–30
|- bgcolor="ccffcc"
| 43 || May 29 || Phillies || 3–2 || O'Donnell (2–4) || Ridzik || — || 2,525 || 13–30
|- bgcolor="ffbbbb"
| 44 || May 30 || Phillies || 0–8 || Roberts || Littlefield (0–1) || — || 2,525 || 13–31
|- bgcolor="ffbbbb"
| 45 || May 30 || Phillies || 7–10 || Drews || Friend (1–5) || Konstanty || 9,651 || 13–32
|- bgcolor="ffbbbb"
| 46 || May 31 || Giants || 0–4 || Gomez || Yochim (0–1) || — ||  || 13–33
|- bgcolor="ccffcc"
| 47 || May 31 || Giants || 4–3 || Law (4–5) || Wilhelm || — || 10,506 || 14–33
|-

|- bgcolor="ccffcc"
| 48 || June 4 || @ Braves || 4–1 || Surkont (5–5) || Nichols || — || 21,582 || 15–33
|- bgcolor="ffbbbb"
| 49 || June 5 || @ Braves || 0–7 || Spahn || O'Donnell (2–5) || — || 19,415 || 15–34
|- bgcolor="ffbbbb"
| 50 || June 6 || @ Braves || 0–5 || Wilson || Law (4–6) || — ||  || 15–35
|- bgcolor="ccffcc"
| 51 || June 6 || @ Braves || 6–4 || Littlefield (1–1) || Gorin || — || 34,095 || 16–35
|- bgcolor="ffbbbb"
| 52 || June 8 || @ Redlegs || 0–5 || Valentine || O'Donnell (2–6) || — || 4,342 || 16–36
|- bgcolor="ffbbbb"
| 53 || June 9 || @ Redlegs || 3–4 || Nuxhall || Surkont (5–6) || — || 4,813 || 16–37
|- bgcolor="ffbbbb"
| 54 || June 10 || @ Redlegs || 0–6 || Baczewski || Thies (1–2) || — || 1,900 || 16–38
|- bgcolor="ccffcc"
| 55 || June 11 || @ Cardinals || 8–5 || Law (5–6) || Presko || Hetki (5) || 9,820 || 17–38
|- bgcolor="ccffcc"
| 56 || June 12 || @ Cardinals || 4–2 || Littlefield (2–1) || Staley || — || 11,365 || 18–38
|- bgcolor="ffbbbb"
| 57 || June 13 || @ Cardinals || 0–5 || Haddix || O'Donnell (2–7) || — || 11,365 || 18–39
|- bgcolor="ffbbbb"
| 58 || June 13 || @ Cardinals || 3–5 || Miller || LaPalme (0–5) || — || 16,648 || 18–40
|- bgcolor="ffbbbb"
| 59 || June 14 || Cubs || 5–6 || Davis || Surkont (5–7) || Minner || 6,462 || 18–41
|- bgcolor="ccffcc"
| 60 || June 18 || Braves || 2–1 || Law (6–6) || Spahn || — || 8,859 || 19–41
|- bgcolor="ffbbbb"
| 61 || June 19 || Braves || 2–11 || Jolly || Littlefield (2–2) || — || 3,961 || 19–42
|- bgcolor="ccffcc"
| 62 || June 20 || Braves || 2–1 (10) || Surkont (6–7) || Burdette || — || 8,859 || 20–42
|- bgcolor="ccffcc"
| 63 || June 20 || Braves || 6–3 || Friend (2–5) || Buhl || Law (1) || 10,236 || 21–42
|- bgcolor="ffbbbb"
| 64 || June 23 || Cardinals || 1–7 || Haddix || Littlefield (2–3) || — || 9,301 || 21–43
|- bgcolor="ffbbbb"
| 65 || June 24 || Cardinals || 1–5 || Lawrence || Law (6–7) || — || 2,637 || 21–44
|- bgcolor="ffbbbb"
| 66 || June 25 || Redlegs || 4–8 || Fowler || Surkont (6–8) || Smith || 6,327 || 21–45
|- bgcolor="ccffcc"
| 67 || June 26 || Redlegs || 4–3 || Friend (3–5) || Baczewski || — || 2,551 || 22–45
|- bgcolor="ffbbbb"
| 68 || June 27 || Redlegs || 0–9 || Valentine || Law (6–8) || — ||  || 22–46
|- bgcolor="ccffcc"
| 69 || June 27 || Redlegs || 4–3 || Hetki (2–0) || Podbielan || — || 7,717 || 23–46
|- bgcolor="ffbbbb"
| 70 || June 29 || Phillies || 0–4 || Wehmeier || Surkont (6–9) || — || 5,088 || 23–47
|- bgcolor="ffbbbb"
| 71 || June 30 || Phillies || 0–8 || Roberts || Law (6–9) || — || 4,209 || 23–48
|-

|- bgcolor="ffbbbb"
| 72 || July 2 || Giants || 5–9 || Wilhelm || Friend (3–6) || Maglie || 9,603 || 23–49
|- bgcolor="ccffcc"
| 73 || July 3 || Giants || 6–4 || Littlefield (3–3) || Hearn || O'Donnell (1) || 3,488 || 24–49
|- bgcolor="ffbbbb"
| 74 || July 4 || Giants || 2–9 || Liddle || Surkont (6–10) || McCall || 3,488 || 24–50
|- bgcolor="ccffcc"
| 75 || July 4 || Giants || 7–6 || LaPalme (1–5) || Grissom || Hetki (6) || 12,818 || 25–50
|- bgcolor="ffbbbb"
| 76 || July 5 || Dodgers || 6–8 || Wade || Law (6–10) || Hughes || 9,603 || 25–51
|- bgcolor="ffbbbb"
| 77 || July 5 || Dodgers || 2–7 || Loes || Thies (1–3) || — || 16,905 || 25–52
|- bgcolor="ffbbbb"
| 78 || July 6 || @ Phillies || 0–3 || Simmons || Friend (3–7) || — || 3,967 || 25–53
|- bgcolor="ffbbbb"
| 79 || July 9 || @ Giants || 3–6 || Antonelli || LaPalme (1–6) || — || 12,423 || 25–54
|- bgcolor="ccffcc"
| 80 || July 10 || @ Giants || 10–7 || O'Donnell (3–7) || Wilhelm || — || 9,744 || 26–54
|- bgcolor="ffbbbb"
| 81 || July 11 || @ Giants || 7–13 || Maglie || Law (6–11) || Grissom || 9,744 || 26–55
|- bgcolor="ccffcc"
| 82 || July 11 || @ Giants || 5–1 || Littlefield (4–3) || Hearn || — || 21,504 || 27–55
|- bgcolor="ffbbbb"
| 83 || July 15 || @ Cubs || 2–9 || Minner || Surkont (6–11) || — || 5,900 || 27–56
|- bgcolor="ffbbbb"
| 84 || July 15 || @ Cubs || 0–3 || Hacker || O'Donnell (3–8) || Tremel || 10,855 || 27–57
|- bgcolor="ffbbbb"
| 85 || July 16 || @ Cubs || 2–3 || Rush || Hetki (2–1) || — || 4,586 || 27–58
|- bgcolor="ffbbbb"
| 86 || July 17 || @ Cubs || 3–11 || Davis || Law (6–12) || Tremel || 4,586 || 27–59
|- bgcolor="ccffcc"
| 87 || July 17 || @ Cubs || 6–2 || Purkey (2–6) || Klippstein || O'Donnell (2) || 10,842 || 28–59
|- bgcolor="ffbbbb"
| 88 || July 18 || @ Braves || 1–4 || Spahn || Littlefield (4–4) || Johnson || 25,074 || 28–60
|- bgcolor="ccffcc"
| 89 || July 18 || @ Braves || 7–5 || Friend (4–7) || Nichols || — || 29,371 || 29–60
|- bgcolor="ffbbbb"
| 90 || July 19 || @ Braves || 1–4 || Wilson || Surkont (6–12) || — || 23,281 || 29–61
|- bgcolor="ffbbbb"
| 91 || July 21 || @ Cardinals || 12–13 || Lawrence || O'Donnell (3–9) || Haddix || 6,623 || 29–62
|- bgcolor="ffbbbb"
| 92 || July 22 || @ Cardinals || 2–3 (14) || Staley || Friend (4–8) || — || 7,059 || 29–63
|- bgcolor="ccffcc"
| 93 || July 23 || @ Redlegs || 7–4 || Littlefield (5–4) || Nuxhall || — || 7,682 || 30–63
|- bgcolor="ffbbbb"
| 94 || July 24 || @ Redlegs || 3–5 || Fowler || Surkont (6–13) || Smith || 3,383 || 30–64
|- bgcolor="ccffcc"
| 95 || July 25 || @ Redlegs || 4–2 || LaPalme (2–6) || Perkowski || — ||  || 31–64
|- bgcolor="ffbbbb"
| 96 || July 25 || @ Redlegs || 2–3 || Judson || Friend (4–9) || Smith || 13,514 || 31–65
|- bgcolor="ffbbbb"
| 97 || July 26 || Braves || 1–3 || Conley || Purkey (2–7) || — || 6,850 || 31–66
|- bgcolor="ffbbbb"
| 98 || July 28 || Braves || 4–6 || Burdette || Littlefield (5–5) || Jolly || 6,728 || 31–67
|- bgcolor="ffbbbb"
| 99 || July 29 || Braves || 3–5 (10) || Nichols || Hetki (2–2) || — || 2,259 || 31–68
|- bgcolor="ccffcc"
| 100 || July 30 || Cubs || 8–6 || Purkey (3–7) || Minner || Hetki (7) || 6,728 || 32–68
|- bgcolor="ffbbbb"
| 101 || July 30 || Cubs || 5–8 || Pollet || Surkont (6–14) || Jeffcoat || 7,754 || 32–69
|- bgcolor="ccffcc"
| 102 || July 31 || Cubs || 5–3 || LaPalme (3–6) || Hacker || Friend (1) || 2,688 || 33–69
|-

|- bgcolor="ccffcc"
| 103 || August 1 || Cubs || 2–0 || Littlefield (6–5) || Davis || — || 2,688 || 34–69
|- bgcolor="ffbbbb"
| 104 || August 1 || Cubs || 2–12 || Cole || Pepper (0–1) || — || 7,281 || 34–70
|- bgcolor="ffbbbb"
| 105 || August 3 || Redlegs || 2–7 || Nuxhall || Friend (4–10) || — || 4,671 || 34–71
|- bgcolor="ccffcc"
| 106 || August 4 || Redlegs || 4–3 || Law (7–12) || Smith || — || 3,778 || 35–71
|- bgcolor="ccffcc"
| 107 || August 6 || Cardinals || 7–3 || Littlefield (7–5) || Poholsky || — || 2,688 || 36–71
|- bgcolor="ccffcc"
| 108 || August 6 || Cardinals || 6–5 || Hetki (3–2) || Lawrence || — || 8,624 || 37–71
|- bgcolor="ffbbbb"
| 109 || August 7 || Cardinals || 6–8 || Presko || Purkey (3–8) || Brazle || 3,846 || 37–72
|- bgcolor="ccffcc"
| 110 || August 8 || Cardinals || 12–4 || LaPalme (4–6) || Haddix || — || 8,624 || 38–72
|- bgcolor="ccffcc"
| 111 || August 8 || Cardinals || 5–3 || Surkont (7–14) || Staley || — || 10,790 || 39–72
|- bgcolor="ffbbbb"
| 112 || August 10 || Giants || 1–2 || Antonelli || Littlefield (7–6) || Grissom || 9,945 || 39–73
|- bgcolor="ccffcc"
| 113 || August 13 || @ Phillies || 9–5 || Friend (5–10) || Roberts || — || 24,536 || 40–73
|- bgcolor="ccffcc"
| 114 || August 13 || @ Phillies || 5–0 || Thies (2–3) || Wehmeier || — || 8,804 || 41–73
|- bgcolor="ccffcc"
| 115 || August 14 || @ Phillies || 8–4 || Law (8–12) || Simmons || — || 2,865 || 42–73
|- bgcolor="ccffcc"
| 116 || August 15 || @ Phillies || 9–6 || Littlefield (8–6) || Dickson || Hetki (8) || 2,865 || 43–73
|- bgcolor="ffbbbb"
| 117 || August 15 || @ Phillies || 6–7 || Roberts || Hetki (3–3) || — || 4,773 || 43–74
|- bgcolor="ccffcc"
| 118 || August 17 || Dodgers || 4–2 || Surkont (8–14) || Podres || — || 20,102 || 44–74
|- bgcolor="ffbbbb"
| 119 || August 18 || Dodgers || 2–3 || Erskine || Thies (2–4) || Hughes || 18,797 || 44–75
|- bgcolor="ffbbbb"
| 120 || August 19 || Dodgers || 5–7 || Newcombe || Law (8–13) || Hughes || 9,299 || 44–76
|- bgcolor="ffbbbb"
| 121 || August 20 || @ Giants || 0–4 || Liddle || Littlefield (8–7) || — || 8,985 || 44–77
|- bgcolor="ffbbbb"
| 122 || August 22 || @ Giants || 4–5 || McCall || LaPalme (4–7) || — ||  || 44–78
|- bgcolor="ffbbbb"
| 123 || August 22 || @ Giants || 3–5 || Wilhelm || Surkont (8–15) || — || 22,702 || 44–79
|- bgcolor="ccffcc"
| 124 || August 24 || @ Cardinals || 8–7 || Littlefield (9–7) || Haddix || Law (2) || 8,718 || 45–79
|- bgcolor="ffbbbb"
| 125 || August 25 || @ Cardinals || 0–13 || Jones || Thies (2–5) || — || 6,826 || 45–80
|- bgcolor="ccffcc"
| 126 || August 26 || @ Cardinals || 2–1 || Pepper (1–1) || Beard || Law (3) || 7,094 || 46–80
|- bgcolor="ffbbbb"
| 127 || August 27 || @ Redlegs || 2–3 || Nuxhall || Surkont (8–16) || — || 5,227 || 46–81
|- bgcolor="ffbbbb"
| 128 || August 28 || @ Redlegs || 1–2 || Valentine || LaPalme (4–8) || — || 2,995 || 46–82
|- bgcolor="ffbbbb"
| 129 || August 29 || @ Cubs || 4–7 || Jeffcoat || Littlefield (9–8) || — || 5,790 || 46–83
|- bgcolor="ffbbbb"
| 130 || August 29 || @ Cubs || 1–4 || Davis || Hetki (3–4) || — || 15,318 || 46–84
|- bgcolor="ffbbbb"
| 131 || August 31 || @ Cubs || 2–14 || Pollet || Pepper (1–2) || — || 15,318 || 46–85
|- bgcolor="ffbbbb"
| 132 || August 31 || @ Cubs || 3–7 || Rush || Thies (2–6) || Jeffcoat || 18,217 || 46–86
|-

|- bgcolor="ffbbbb"
| 133 || September 1 || @ Braves || 1–3 || Spahn || Surkont (8–17) || — || 40,494 || 46–87
|- bgcolor="ffbbbb"
| 134 || September 3 || Phillies || 1–7 || Simmons || Friend (5–11) || — || 10,790 || 46–88
|- bgcolor="ffbbbb"
| 135 || September 3 || Phillies || 2–10 || Ridzik || Littlefield (9–9) || — || 5,302 || 46–89
|- bgcolor="ffbbbb"
| 136 || September 5 || Phillies || 5–12 || Wehmeier || Pepper (1–3) || — || 4,645 || 46–90
|- bgcolor="ccffcc"
| 137 || September 6 || @ Dodgers || 9–6 (12) || Law (9–13) || Loes || — || 26,349 || 47–90
|- bgcolor="ccffcc"
| 138 || September 6 || @ Dodgers || 9–7 || Thies (3–6) || Newcombe || Friend (2) || 21,561 || 48–90
|- bgcolor="ffbbbb"
| 139 || September 8 || Braves || 2–5 || Spahn || Littlefield (9–10) || — || 2,516 || 48–91
|- bgcolor="ccffcc"
| 140 || September 10 || Cardinals || 3–2 || Hetki (4–4) || Staley || — || 2,615 || 49–91
|- bgcolor="ffbbbb"
| 141 || September 11 || Cardinals || 2–7 || Poholsky || Pepper (1–4) || — || 1,851 || 49–92
|- bgcolor="ffbbbb"
| 142 || September 12 || Redlegs || 5–11 || Nuxhall || LaPalme (4–9) || — ||  || 49–93
|- bgcolor="ffbbbb"
| 143 || September 12 || Redlegs || 2–13 || Lane || Thies (3–7) || Ross || 5,672 || 49–94
|- bgcolor="ccffcc"
| 144 || September 13 || Redlegs || 6–5 || Littlefield (10–10) || Judson || — || 1,148 || 50–94
|- bgcolor="ffbbbb"
| 145 || September 14 || Cubs || 2–9 || Rush || Thies (3–8) || — || 1,851 || 50–95
|- bgcolor="ccffcc"
| 146 || September 14 || Cubs || 4–0 || Friend (6–11) || Minner || — || 2,361 || 51–95
|- bgcolor="ccffcc"
| 147 || September 17 || Dodgers || 9–1 || Surkont (9–17) || Loes || — || 6,198 || 52–95
|- bgcolor="ccffcc"
| 148 || September 19 || Dodgers || 1–0 || Friend (7–11) || Meyer || — || 21,308 || 53–95
|- bgcolor="ffbbbb"
| 149 || September 22 || @ Phillies || 1–12 || Simmons || Pepper (1–5) || — || 5,157 || 53–96
|- bgcolor="ffbbbb"
| 150 || September 22 || @ Phillies || 1–5 || Roberts || Littlefield (10–11) || — || 2,837 || 53–97
|- bgcolor="ffbbbb"
| 151 || September 23 || @ Phillies || 2–4 || Wehmeier || LaPalme (4–10) || — || 936 || 53–98
|- bgcolor="ffbbbb"
| 152 || September 24 || @ Dodgers || 5–6 || Erskine || Surkont (9–18) || Hughes || 751 || 53–99
|- bgcolor="ffbbbb"
| 153 || September 25 || @ Dodgers || 5–10 || Meyer || Friend (7–12) || Labine || 4,597 || 53–100
|- bgcolor="ffbbbb"
| 154 || September 26 || @ Dodgers || 0–1 || Spooner || Thies (3–9) || — || 9,344 || 53–101
|-

|-
| Legend:       = Win       = LossBold = Pirates team member

Opening Day lineup

Notable transactions 
 June 14, 1954: Hal Rice was traded by the Pirates to the Chicago Cubs for Luis Márquez.

Roster

Player stats

Batting

Starters by position 
Note: Pos = Position; G = Games played; AB = At bats; H = Hits; Avg. = Batting average; HR = Home runs; RBI = Runs batted in

Other batters 
Note: G = Games played; AB = At bats; H = Hits; Avg. = Batting average; HR = Home runs; RBI = Runs batted in

Pitching

Starting pitchers 
Note: G = Games pitched; IP = Innings pitched; W = Wins; L = Losses; ERA = Earned run average; SO = Strikeouts

Other pitchers 
Note: G = Games pitched; IP = Innings pitched; W = Wins; L = Losses; ERA = Earned run average; SO = Strikeouts

Relief pitchers 
Note: G = Games pitched; W = Wins; L = Losses; SV = Saves; ERA = Earned run average; SO = Strikeouts

Farm system

LEAGUE CHAMPIONS: Waco

Notes

References 
 1954 Pittsburgh Pirates at Baseball Reference
 1954 Pittsburgh Pirates at Baseball Almanac

Pittsburgh Pirates seasons
Pittsburgh Pirates season
Pittsburg Pir